Kitty Margolis (born November 7, 1955 in  San Mateo, California) is an American jazz singer who founded Mad Kat Records with vocalist Madeline Eastman. She won the Talent Deserving Wider Recognition award in the critics' poll at Down Beat magazine in 1993, 1995, and 1997. Her debut album, Evolution (1993), featured Joe Henderson, and Joe Louis Walker, while her follow-up, Straight Up With a Twist (1997) had appearances by  Charles Brown and Roy Hargrove. These were followed by Left Coast Life (2001) and Heart & Soul: Live in San Francisco (2004).

Discography

References

1955 births
Living people
American women jazz singers
American jazz singers
21st-century American women